Limon and Oli is an animated cartoon series for children aged 4–9, created by Salih Memecan. The series has aired on Disney Junior since 2015 in 110 Europe, the Middle East and Africa countries. The show is based on the daily comic strip, Sizinkiler ("Your kind of family"), which has been published in a Turkish national newspaper since 1991.

Premise 

The television series revolves around the adventures of two anthropomorphic chicken chicks, Limon and Oli, in dealing with school, themselves, neighbors, or others.

Airing history

The first season of Limon and Oli was aired as 26 five-minute episodes on Turkish TV, TRT Children's Channel, from 2012 to 2013. The next season aired on Disney Junior as 26 seven-minute episodes. The second season began in Turkey on Disney Junior, in November 2014, and had reached the airwaves of 110 countries by April 2015. Two additional seasons, totaling 52 seven-minute episodes, are slated to air on Disney Junior across those 110 CEEMA countries through 2017.

Characters

Limon: A female yellow chick and the family's darling little girl. She is in grade school. She likes to think before she acts. Oli usually pulls Limon into an adventure before she can start planning how to go about it. However, she is always ready to join Oli's games. She is the center of attention in her family, especially paid by her mom. May wants to raise a “perfect” child and insists on feeding her healthy meals, enforcing her bed time, checking on her homework, and taking her to all kinds of extracurricular activities.

As a nice and intelligent girl, Limon usually plays along. She is not a stereotypical nerd, but she is curious to learn and is diligent when it comes to school work. She likes to be praised and to be liked. She resorts to her charm and sense of humor to get her way when she wants something at home or in school. She often challenges her parents with her thoughtful, “brilliant” questions.

Her catchphrases: "But why??", "But why not?"

Oli: A male black chick Limon's best friend and partner in crime. Oli is an adventurous, active, dynamic young boy. He is overly self-confident and highly energetic. He is always happy with what he gets. Nothing can put him down. Unlike Limon, Oli acts immediately and intuitively, and adapts to changes easily. Oli is friendly with everyone. Life is mostly fun and games for Oli. He never hesitates to dive into situations where he senses any possibility for fun and play.
He is an expert skateboarder and juggler. He likes being outdoors and prefers to explore life in action over rigid, traditional classroom learning. School is not among his favorite activities. He likes to stay away from school as much as possible.

Oli's parents are rarely seen or mentioned and he is almost always seen at Limon's house, which can lead to the first time viewers to mistake Oli for Limon's brother.

His catchphrases: "Exactamente",  "Am I a genius or what!", "Let me!", "Urgent! Urgent!"

Bubs: Limon's father and May's husband. Bubs loves his family but likes to take it easy and mind his own business. He is too cool for simple everyday chores and issues. He drives May crazy with his indifference to her expectations for romance, but knows how to make her laugh with his witty comments. He is more a realist than a romantic.
He loves to read. He reads books, newspapers, magazines, clippings, and even prospectuses. He has an intellectual side and sense of humor that becomes handy in making May laugh.

Bubs' catchphrases: "Can you bring me...",  "Of course I love you.", "Oh! I forgot!"

May:  A typical multi-tasking, perfectionist, detail-oriented, loving mom. May's family means a lot to her. She is the boss around the house. She wants the best for everyone and goes out of her way to accommodate them. She is tough on her family to keep them on top of their chores and responsibilities. She yearns for romance but gets a few laughs instead.  She has entrepreneurial aspirations and occasionally sees through some of her small business ideas, but she mostly likes to work on her own time and be her own boss. She always questions the meaning of love, life, relationship, and marriage. Anniversaries mean a lot to her. She usually hints at Bubs when their anniversary is around the corner, to avoid feeling catastrophic disappointment. However, she is usually the one who plans the celebration. She struggles with her weight and is always first to jump on the latest diet, exercise, and healthy living fad. She likes to take vacations with her family.

May's catchphrases: "Did you do this? That?", "What is the meaning of love, life, marriage, etc.?", "It's bed time!", "Finish your food!", "Do your homework!"	

Great Great Grandpa: Lives in a small house far away from the city. He is a fun grandpa, and a great storyteller. And, having seen and done them all, he has a lot to tell. He is a life guru!

Gıcıko: A jealous, selfish, and mean character, she tries to ruin Limon and Oli's fun endeavours.

Akonpokon: A born-to-be scientist. He is busy experimenting with scientific projects, inventing things, reading about them. He has little time for petty kids stuff.

Episodes

Season 1
Limon and Oli turn themselves into" Team Crazy Eggs" when faced with a problem or create one just for the adventure of it. But, they have to deal with the incurable protagonist Proto.  Limon and Oli find creative ways to outdo Proto to achieve their goals.

Season 2

References

Sources
 Turkey’s ‘Limon and Oli’ Rolls Out on Disney Junior. Animation Magazine. 25 March 2015. Retrieved 14 November 2015.
 Turkish Toon Limon and Oli flies to Disney Junior. Kidscreen. 25 March 2015. Retrieved 14 November 2015.
 Disney Junior to Air 'Limon and Oli'. Licencemag.com. 26 March 2015. Retrieved 14 November 2015.
 . Retrieved 14 November 2015.
 Sizinkiler - Çatlak Yumurtalar Wikipedia Page. Retrieved 14 November 2015.

External links
limonandoli.com

Turkish-language Disney Channel original programming
Turkish animated television series
Disney Channels Worldwide original programming
Current Turkish television series
Television shows set in Istanbul
Television series produced in Istanbul